Isla María may refer to:

 Islas Marías, an archipelago of four islands that belong to Mexico
 Bleaker Island, known as Isla Maria, Falkland Islands